The Marquess of Villanueva del Fresno is a hereditary title in the Spanish nobility. This marquisate was bestowed by Carlos I to Juan Portocarrero, 7th Lord of Villanueva del Fresno, for services rendered to the Crown.

The Seigniory of Villanueva del Fresno (Spanish: Señorío de Villanueva del Fresno) traces its origins to the year 1332, when Alfonso XI conceded to Martín Fernández Portocarrero the village of Villanueva del Fresno, and granted him the title 1st Lord of Villanueva del Fresno and 2nd Lord of Moguer.

References 

Marquessates in the Spanish nobility